Moonhead may refer to:

People
In the United States:
 Claude Kelly, singer-songwriter
 John Wilson (Caddo) (ca. 1845–1901), a Caddo-Delaware peyote roadman

Music
 Moonhead, an album by Thin White Rope
 Moonhead (song), a song by Pink Floyd